Kilou may refer to:
Kilou, Bazèga, Burkina Faso
Kilou, Bam, Burkina Faso